Tony Ganngiyan is a Micronesian politician and was the sixth Governor of Yap from 12 January 2015 to January 14, 2019. He ran for a second term in the 2018 Yap election, but he lost to Henry Falan. Ganngiyan is one of twenty-two signatories of the Yap State Constitution. Ganngiyan served previously as the speaker of Yap legislature.

References 

Living people
Year of birth missing (living people)
Federated States of Micronesia politicians
Governors of Yap